Yesodot (lit. Foundations) is a Haredi moshav shitufi in central Israel. Located in the Shephelah, it falls under the jurisdiction of Nahal Sorek Regional Council.

History
The village was established at a control point on the Burma Road in 1948 during the Arab–Israeli War on land that had belonged to the depopulated Palestinian village of Umm Kalkha. The community had been established two years earlier by immigrants from Hungary and Poland.

References

Moshavim
Religious Israeli communities
Populated places established in 1948
Populated places in Central District (Israel)
1948 establishments in Israel
Hungarian-Jewish culture in Israel
Polish-Jewish culture in Israel